Part of a series of articles upon Archaeology of Kosovo

Vendenis  or Vindenis was an ancient city in Dardania in Kosovo. Among three road stations that were constructed in Dardania during the Roman Period, Statio Vindenis, is one of the identified stations. This archaeological site is set at the area of the village of Gllamnik, Municipality of Podujeva. The site is located approximately 5 km south, southeast from Podujeva.

History 
The ancient Via Lissus-Naissus Roman road was a diagonal route, connecting the central Balkans region with the Adriatic coast, which passed through Vindenis. The settlement and Roman road station of Vindenis are stretched on the right bank of Llap River vicinity, measuring an area of more or less of 15-20 hectares. During the eighties of the last century, systematic archaeological excavations carried out at this site, uncovered an area in total of 550 m2. Among recorded archaeological findings and features here, the most characteristic ones are the grave burials with the grave goods. The burial rites documented here, tell us about the practise of cremation and inhumation burial rites. Besides, a heavy marble sarcophagus was discovered, most probably especially prepared for a distinguished person of high economical, social and political status. Nonetheless, archaeological investigations identified several dwellings, and in particular a distinguished discovery of a floor mosaic composed with geometrical motifs, at the central part of the mosaic, the figural display panel of the Orpheus, makes this mosaic a special discovery. A special finding discovered at this site, is a gold wedding ring with a cameo which clearly indicates shaking of the right hands, which means an agreement but also symbolizes loyalty and friendship. Geophysical, geomagnetic surveys or prospection’s conducted at this locality in 2008 and 2011, in an area of at least 11 hectares of this important archaeological site, identified traces of remains of different objects that at the first impression, resemble to a military field garrison, most probably stationed there to protect the surrounding area and the road station. The archaeological site of Vindenis, was active during the entire period of the Roman rule as well as during the late antiquity.
It is one of the road stations situated between Ulpiana and Naissus drawn on the Tabula Peutingeriana.

See also 
 Dardania
 Archaeology of Kosovo
 List of settlements in Illyria
 Roman heritage in Kosovo

References 

Dardanians
Illyrian Kosovo
Archaeology of Illyria
Moesia
Archaeology of Kosovo
Dardania (Roman province)
Roman towns and cities in Kosovo
Archaeological sites in Kosovo
Cities in ancient Illyria